Diéné Diawara (born 1988) is a Malian women's basketball player with Limoges ABC of the French Ligue Féminine de Basketball. Diawara also competes for the Mali women's national basketball team. At the FIBA Africa Championship for Women 2007 in Senegal, she helped her squad win the tournament, qualifying it for Basketball at the 2008 Summer Olympics. Diawara was also the top rebounder of the tournament.  She is the sister of Lamine Diawara and Nare Diawara.

References

1988 births
Living people
Malian women's basketball players
Olympic basketball players of Mali
Basketball players at the 2008 Summer Olympics
Malian expatriate basketball people in France
21st-century Malian people